The Real Housewives of Dallas (abbreviated RHOD) is an American reality television series that premiered on Bravo on April 11, 2016. Developed as the ninth installment of The Real Housewives franchise, it aired for five seasons and focused on the personal and professional lives of several women living in Dallas, Texas.

The season five cast consisted of Kary Brittingham, Stephanie Hollman, Tiffany Moon, Brandi Redmond, D’Andra Simmons and Kameron Westcott, with Jennifer Davis Long serving as a friend of the housewives. Previously-featured cast members included original housewives Cary Deuber, Tiffany Hendra and LeeAnne Locken.

Overview and casting

Seasons 1–3

The Real Housewives of Dallas was announced in November 15, 2015, as the ninth installment of The Real Housewives franchise. The first season premiered on April 11, 2016, and starred Cary Deuber, Tiffany Hendra, Stephanie Hollman, LeeAnne Locken and Brandi Redmond, while Marie Reyes appeared in a recurring capacity. After the first season, Hendra left the show. The second season premiered on August 14, 2017, with D'Andra Simmons and Kameron Westcott joining the cast, and Hendra appearing in a guest capacity.

The third season premiered on August 15, 2018, which featured the cast from the previous season with occasional guest appearances from Joyce Morrison.

Seasons 4–5
The fourth season premiered on September 4, 2019. Deuber was demoted in a "friend of" capacity. Kary Brittingham joined as a main cast member, and Hendra appeared as a guest. Locken departed the series after the fourth season. The fifth season, which premiered on January 5, 2021, featured new cast member Tiffany Moon, with Jennifer Davis Long appearing as a friend of the housewives.

The show is currently on hiatus with Bravo revealing it had no immediate plans to renew the series for a sixth season.

Timeline of cast members

Episodes

Reception

Ratings

Broadcast history
The Real Housewives of Dallas aired regularly on Bravo in the United States; most episodes were approximately forty-two minutes in length, and are broadcast in high definition. The series alternated airing between Monday, Tuesday, Wednesday and Thursday evenings and shifted between the 9:00, and 10:00 PM timeslots.

References

External links

 
 

 
2010s American reality television series
2020s American reality television series
2016 American television series debuts
2021 American television series endings
Bravo (American TV network) original programming
English-language television shows
Culture of Dallas
Television shows filmed in Texas
Television shows set in Dallas
Women in Texas